The Little Kanawha River is a tributary of the Ohio River, 169 mi (269 km) long, in western West Virginia in the United States.  Via the Ohio, it is part of the watershed of the Mississippi River, draining an area of 2,320 mi² (6,009 km²) on the unglaciated portion of the Allegheny Plateau.  It served as an important commercial water route in the early history of West Virginia, particularly in the logging and petroleum industries.

Course
The Little Kanawha rises in southern Upshur County, approximately 20 mi (32 km) south of Buckhannon. It follows a meandering course generally west-northwestwardly, through Lewis, Braxton, Gilmer, Calhoun, Wirt and Wood Counties, past the communities of Burnsville, Stouts Mills, Sand Fork, Glenville, Grantsville, Bigbend, Creston, Burning Springs, Palestine, Elizabeth, and Newark, to its mouth at the Ohio River in Parkersburg.

About 3 mi (5 km) upstream of Burnsville, a U.S. Army Corps of Engineers dam causes the river to form Burnsville Lake, which was completed in 1976 at a cost of $56.2 million.

Tributaries
Along its course the Little Kanawha River collects the Right Fork Little Kanawha River on the boundary of Lewis and Braxton counties; Saltlick Creek and Oil Creek in Braxton County; Sand Fork, Cedar Creek and Leading Creek in Gilmer County; Steer Creek in Calhoun County; the West Fork Little Kanawha River, Spring Creek, Reedy Creek, and the Hughes River (its largest tributary) in Wirt County; and Walker Creek, Tygart Creek, Slate Creek and Worthington Creek in Wood County.

Additionally, a minor tributary near Grantsville is known as the Bull River; despite being named a "river," it is no larger than dozens of other small streams that flow into the Little Kanawha.

Name
The Little Kanawha River was named for its smaller size relative to the nearby Kanawha River.

According to the Geographic Names Information System, the Little Kanawha River has also been known as:

See also
Kanawha River
List of rivers of West Virginia
Burnsville Bridge
Duck Run Cable Suspension Bridge
Glenville Truss Bridge
Stouts Mill Bridge

References

External links
United States Environmental Protection Agency, watershed profile for Little Kanawha River
 Local Little Kanawha River history on rootsweb.com

 
Rivers of West Virginia
Tributaries of the Ohio River
Rivers of Upshur County, West Virginia
Rivers of Lewis County, West Virginia
Rivers of Braxton County, West Virginia
Rivers of Gilmer County, West Virginia
Rivers of Calhoun County, West Virginia
Rivers of Wirt County, West Virginia
Rivers of Wood County, West Virginia
Allegheny Plateau